When I Live by the Garden and the Sea is an EP from the Portland, Oregon based, ambient musician Matthew Cooper, under the name Eluvium. The song "As I Drift Off" opened  with an audio fragment from the 1989 film, The 'Burbs.

In February 2007, American webzine Somewhere Cold voted When I Live by the Garden and the Sea EP of the Year on their 2006 Somewhere Cold Awards Hall of Fame.

Track listing
 "I Will Not Forget That I Have Forgotten" – 5:20
 "As I Drift Off" – 3:47
 "All the Sails" – 5:45
 "When I Live by the Garden and the Sea" – 7:32

References

2006 EPs
Eluvium (musician) albums
Temporary Residence Limited albums